Flines-lez-Raches (literally Flines near Raches) is a commune in the Nord department in northern France.

It was once the site of Flines Abbey.

Population

Heraldry

See also
Communes of the Nord department

References

Flineslezraches
French Flanders